Millom is a town and civil parish on the north shore of the estuary of the River Duddon in southwest Cumbria, historically part of Cumberland, England.

Millom was constructed as a new town, beginning in 1866 and subsumed the village of Holborn Hill. Built around ironworks, the town grew to a size of over 10,000 people by the 1960s, but has struggled since the works were closed in 1968. Culturally, Millom is notable as the birthplace of poet Norman Nicholson, and for its historical links with rugby league.

The name is Cumbrian dialect for "At the mills".

History
Millom is mentioned in the Domesday Book of 1086 as one of the townships forming the Manor of Hougun which had been held by Tostig Godwinson, Earl of Northumbria.

Millom Castle is a grade I listed building and scheduled ancient monument which by 1739 was in dilapidated condition.

In 1251 a market charter was granted by King Henry III of England to John de Huddleston, Lord of Millom.

Millom is the most southerly town in the historic county of Cumberland.

The Whitehaven & Furness Junction Railway opened a station in 1850 known as 'Holborn Hill Halt' until Millom new town was built in 1866. It was taken over by the Furness Railway in 1866.

A map of 1862 shows that all that existed was a small hamlet by the name of Holborn Hill on the northwest side of the railway line. It had a railway station, inn and a tile and brickworks. By 1899 a small town had grown up here, with terraced streets on either side of the railway, a public library, police station, banks, hotels, school, market square and allotments.

In the intervening years, the Hodbarrow iron mines began extracting haematite from deposits between the village of Holborn Hill and the seashore at Hodbarrow. The first shafts were sunk in the 1850s, by 1881 there were seven pits operated by the Hodbarrow Mining Company.  Millom & Askam Iron Company built Millom Ironworks and the first furnaces were completed in 1866. The opening of the ironworks led to the building of Millom newtown. The Hodbarrow Outer Barrier (seawall) was completed in 1905 to protect the mines from the sea. It took five years to construct at a cost of almost £600,000. The Hodbarrow Mines and Millom Ironworks were closed in 1968. The town's population of 10,997 in 1967 fell to 7,101 by the 1971 census.

In 1877 the expanding town needed more water and Whicham Beck was dammed at Baystone Bank (54.261226,-3.274237) to form Baystone Bank Reservoir. The reservoir remained in use until about 1996. It was drained in 2011, the dam removed and the valley returned to its original form. This work was carried out by water network company United Utilities.

During the Second World War an airfield, RAF Millom, was developed on flat coastal land at Haverigg. This was an advanced flying training station, mainly for Observers and also Air Gunners. Aircraft stationed there were firstly the Blackburn Botha and Fairey Battle, then the more popular and successful Avro Anson. Post-war this became the site of HM Prison Haverigg.

Throughout its history, the town has struggled with socio-economic problems, especially after the Industrial Revolution, thus being infamously called by the Mayor of Copeland, 'a place of despair'.

Governance
Millom is within the Copeland UK Parliamentary constituency, Trudy Harrison is the Member of parliament.

Before Brexit, it was part of the North West England European Parliamentary Constituency.

For Local Government purposes it is in the Millom ward of the Borough of Copeland and the Millom division of Cumbria County Council. With the local government changes of county boundaries in 1974, the administrative county of Cumberland was abolished and Millom formed part of the new county of Cumbria.

Millom also has its own Parish Council; Millom Town Council, The parish had a population of 7,829 in 2011 and is divided into four wards, Holborn Hill, Newtown North, Newtown South and Haverigg.

The latest round of proposals in the Sixth Periodic Review of Westminster constituencies would place Millom in the Barrow and Furness constituency as part of boundary changes to abolish the Copeland and Workington constituencies.

Economy
Millom's economy is now mainly based around retail, services and tourism. It is a relatively low wage area, with a lot of people employed in skilled trades such as building, painting and decorating.  Many also work in the service sector in hotels, pubs and shops within the nearby Lake District National Park. Higher wage centres are Barrow-in-Furness to the south and Sellafield to the north-west with commuting each way on the road or via the railway.

Millom was granted the status of a Fairtrade town in 2004.

Culture and community
Millom Palladium, is a theatre, bar and full multi-functional venue. Completed in 1911, it has stood on the site for over 100 years. This building and entertainments venue is home to Millom Amateur Operatic Society (MAOS) founded in 1909 and is currently an ongoing project run and managed by a registered charity and group of volunteers with hopes to re-instate the cinema facility within the building. The facility currently hosts pantomime and music events and can be hired for weddings, balls or private parties.

The Beggar's Theatre is a multi-function arts base with several activities, performing-arts based, for local talent and provides a venue for touring theatres, stand-up comedians etc.

Norman Nicholson Society
The Norman Nicholson Society promotes and explores the work of the town's most famous son, the writer Norman Nicholson, who spent his whole life in the town.

Landmarks

St. George's Church stands within the town on a small hill and with its steeple is the biggest landmark of the town being visible from quite a distance.

It forms a grand panoramic viewing platform of the south-west Lake District area and offers a view of England, Scotland, Ireland and Wales on a clear day.

Millom Discovery Centre (previously known as 'Millom Folk Museum' and 'Millom Heritage Museum And Visitor Centre') presents a snapshot of past times in Millom, paying particular attention to the historical development of the area brought about by the significant iron ore mining and iron works.

Millom Rock Park is situated high on the north rim of the nearby Ghyll Scaur Quarry in the parish of Millom Without. A viewpoint in the Rock Park permits views into the working quarry and overlooks the processing machinery. There is an avenue of 15 large rock specimens with detailed interpretation panels.

There are two nature reserves near the town, both of which are located on the Duddon Estuary; an internationally important area for wildlife and designated a Site of Special Scientific Interest (SSSI). Hodbarrow Nature Reserve is owned by the RSPB and is located to the south of the town, which in October 2005, saw the unveiling of its new public aid, with logos produced by local artists Stuart Edwards and Holly Parminter. Millom Iron Works Local Nature Reserve is located to the east of the town. Both reserves are important for tern species and a number of wading birds and waterfowl. Hodbarrow is renowned for large numbers of wildfowl during the winter. Various birds of prey can be seen hunting on both reserves throughout the year.

In 1866 the Hodbarrow Mining Company built a lighthouse on Hodbarrow Point to guide ships to its dock. When the company built a seawall in 1905 to protect its mineworkings, it established a new lighthouse on the wall and abandoned the old one. Both structures still stand. In 2004 the newer lighthouse (which had itself been abandoned in 1949) was refurbished as part of a local community initiative. At the time a new solar-powered light was placed in the lantern which used to operate at night, but by 2016 it was no longer functioning.

RAF Millom Museum closed in 2010.

Transport
Millom is served by Millom railway station on the Cumbrian Coast Line.

The A5093 road goes through the town and is itself a loop off of the A595. The town council supports the building of a road bridge across the Duddon estuary between Millom and the Furness peninsula.

Education
Millom School is a secondary school and sixth form, for pupils from 11 – 19 years old. It houses the adult education centre, an all-weather sports pitch and the "Melvyn Bragg Drama Studio" which was opened in 2005. At one time it had a swimming pool however this was demolished by Cumbria County Council.

There are a number of other schools in the town including;
 Millom Infants School, 
 The Nursery, 
 St James' Catholic Primary School,
 Black Combe Junior School, which was built in the early 1970s; its first headmaster, Frank Eccles, died 1 January 2013 aged 89.

Health
Primary health care is provided at the town's 'community' hospital. It also provides some clinics, physiotherapy, podiatry and has a small x-ray facility. The inpatients occupy one ward spanning a six- (now five-) bed bay, a four-bed bay, twin and single rooms. The hospital does not offer A+E service nor any other 'drop-in' healthcare services.

Religious sites
Millom's original parish church is Holy Trinity, a grade I listed building dating to the 12th century. In 1877 the growth of the town required the building of another church and architects Paley and Austin were commissioned to build St George's, a Grade II Listed building. There are also Roman Catholic, Baptist and Methodist churches and a community church. Jehovah's Witnesses also have a Kingdom Hall in the town.

Sport

Millom Recreation Centre comprises a large sports hall and a small multi-gym and caters for a wide range of different sports. Millom has a Crown green bowling club, tennis and cricket are also played in the town.

Millom Rugby League Club is the oldest existing amateur rugby league club in the world having been founded in 1873.

Millom has a Rugby Union club which was formed in 1873, making it one of the oldest rugby clubs in England.

Notable people

 John A. Agnew, British-American political geographer.
 Professor John T Andrews, (Born in Millom 1937, educated Millom School, played  for the U-19 English Schools Rugby team in 1955 and 1956) University of Colorado Boulder, Fellow American Geophysical Union, Fellow American Association Science. Penrose Medal 2016 Geological Society of America.
 Norman Nicholson, poet and author, whose work was published by T. S. Eliot at Faber and Faber, spent his entire life in Millom. He is commemorated by a blue plaque.
 Jimmy Settle, English international footballer, was born in Millom in 1874.

See also

 Listed buildings in Millom
 Millom Without
 :Category:People from Millom
 Millom Rural District

References

External links

Cumbria County History Trust: Millom (nb: provisional research only – see Talk page)
Cumbria County History Trust: Millom, Rural (nb: provisional research only – see Talk page)
 Picture of the active Hodbarrow Point Lighthouse

 
Towns in Cumbria
Civil parishes in Cumbria
Borough of Copeland